Chang'ombe is an administrative ward in the Dodoma Urban district of the Dodoma Region of Tanzania.

In 2016 the Tanzania National Bureau of Statistics report there were 13,676 people in the ward, from 25,415 in 2012. The ward has .

References

Wards of Dodoma Region